Nicholas Ulrich Mayall (May 9, 1906 – January 5, 1993) was an American observational astronomer. After obtaining his doctorate from the University of California, Berkeley, Mayall worked at the Lick Observatory, where he remained from 1934 to 1960, except for a brief period at MIT's Radiation Laboratory during World War II.

During his time at Lick, Mayall contributed to astronomical knowledge of nebulae, supernovae, spiral galaxy internal motions, the redshifts of galaxies, and the origin, age, and size of the Universe. He played a significant role in the planning and construction of Lick's  reflector, which represented a major improvement over its earlier  telescope.

From 1960, Mayall spent 11 years as director of the Kitt Peak National Observatory until his retirement in 1971. Under his leadership KPNO, and the Cerro Tololo Inter-American Observatory, developed into two of the world's top research observatories, equipped with premier telescopes. Mayall was responsible for the construction of the  Kitt Peak reflector, which was named after him. When Mayall died in 1993, his ashes were spread high on an empty ridge of Kitt Peak.

Early life
Mayall's father, Edwin L. Mayall Sr., was an engineer for a manufacturing company in Illinois. His mother, Olive Ulrich Mayall, despite never attending college herself, set high educational standards for Mayall and his younger brother (Edwin Jr., born 1907). Sometime between his brother's birth and 1913, the family moved to California's Modesto area, where Mayall entered first grade. Some time before 1917, they moved again, to Stockton where they remained until 1924 and Mayall's graduation from Stockton High School (except for a brief return to Peoria, Illinois during 1918–1919). During this period, presumably during his high school years, Mayall's parents divorced.

During his senior year, in the fall of 1923, Mayall was secretary of the school science club and set up a club visit to the Lick Observatory. His father permitted him to use his car, a Moline Knight, to transport the club members up the dirt and gravel winding mountain road leading to the observatory. This was Mayall's first visit to the observatory where he would spend much of his career.  After visiting, he read all the astronomy books available in the local libraries, although he did not at that time imagine making astronomy his profession.

Education
Mayall began college in the fall of 1924 at the University of California, Berkeley, studying for a degree in mining. He took up residence with his mother in an apartment on Durant Avenue, and worked at the UC Berkeley library to help support them both. Mayall generally did well at university, and was eventually elected to the Sigma Xi and Phi Beta Kappa honor societies. However, at mid-term examinations of his second year, he achieved poor grades in mineralogy and chemistry laboratory. At a meeting with the dean to discuss his grades the latter became aware that Mayall was color blind, which prevented him from observing small color changes in bead and flame tests, and also kept him from seeing small color changes in precipitations and titrations. Mayall's adviser recommended that he change his major, as he would not be able to graduate as a mining engineer with such a handicap.

Mayall's mother encouraged him to study whatever interested him the most, and to do it well, so he considered astronomy as an alternative to mining. After asking many professors in the astronomy department whether they enjoyed their work and whether they made a satisfactory wage, and being content with their answers, he transferred to the College of Letters and Science to major in astronomy.  This did not set him back in his degree requirements because almost all of his first year studies had been in basic physical sciences and mathematics. Eventually Mayall discovered that he greatly enjoyed astronomy, and decided upon a course of graduate level study followed by a career as a research scientist.

After graduating in 1928, Mayall decided to remain at Berkeley, as it had the best astronomy graduate program of the day. However, he took a hiatus from pursuing his advanced degree and went to work as a human computer at the Mount Wilson Observatory from 1929 to 1931, where he assisted prominent astronomers including Edwin Hubble, Paul W. Merrill, and Milton L. Humason. This activity resulted in him co-authoring papers on Pluto's mass and orbit with Seth Barnes Nicholson and others, shortly after Pluto's discovery

Mayall returned to Berkeley in 1931 to pursue graduate studies. His thesis topic, suggested by Hubble, was to count the number of galaxies per unit area on the sky as a function of position on direct plates taken with the Crossley reflector at Lick. Mayall successfully completed his thesis and was awarded his PhD degree in 1934. Hubble complimented Mayall for his work, although significant results were never achieved (nor by Hubble either) due to the lack of accurate magnitude standards for the faint galaxies that were measured and by the (then unrealized) very strong tendency of galaxies to cluster.

While working on his thesis, Mayall had an idea of designing a small, fast slitless spectrograph, optimized for nebulae and galaxies. He believed that if it were used in conjunction with the Crossley reflector it would make that facility competitive for at least some of the work that Humason and Hubble were doing with the larger Mt. Wilson telescopes.  It was never expected to compete with the Mt. Wilson  instrument for stars or elliptical galaxies, which have condensed and relatively bright nuclei. The spectrograph was to be used instead to study extended, low-surface-brightness gaseous nebulae or irregular galaxies.  Mayall's thesis advisor, William Hammond Wright, and the then head of the Lick stellar spectroscopy program, Joseph Haines Moore, encouraged him to develop his spectrograph. The device was constructed by the Lick Observatory's own workshop, and proved to be more efficient for extended, low-surface-brightness objects, particularly in the ultraviolet part of the spectrum, thus confirming the expectations of Mayall. With Wright's strong encouragement, Mayall had used fused quartz to make ultraviolet transmitting optics, whereas the Mt. Wilson spectrographs used heavy glass lenses and prisms, which absorb ultraviolet radiation.

Lick Observatory

While Mayall hoped to join the Mount Wilson team upon earning his doctorate, there were no openings during the Great Depression. Instead, he began his career at Lick, which was afforded by the number two janitor resigning and Mayall being given a one-year position as observing assistant with janitorial duties limited to maintaining the darkrooms and keeping instrument rooms clean. The following year, one of the senior astronomers joined the Berkeley department and his salary was split between Mayall and another young astronomer, Arthur Bambridge Wyse.

On June 30, 1934, Mayall married Kathleen (Kay) Boxall from Los Angeles, who he had met during his two years in Pasadena. They lived in a small apartment that was part of the little astronomy village on the Mount Hamilton summit, where all Lick astronomers resided at that time.

Using his newly built spectrograph, Mayall was the first to determine the radial velocities of many knots of gas in the Crab Nebula. Using these data and the previously published angular rate of expansion of the nebula, he was able to estimate its distance.  Consequently, he became the first person to recognize and demonstrate that the Crab Nebula was the remnant of a supernova observed and recorded in 1054 (SN 1054), rather than a classical nova.  Walter Baade was instrumental in stimulating and counseling Mayall after around 1939, taking on the role previously filled by Hubble.

In 1941, together with Arthur Wyse and Lawrence Aller, Mayall studied the rotation of nearby galaxies and found that there was much matter that was too faint to be observed, but which could be detected by way of its gravitational effect.  He spent about three years until 1942 researching 50 Milky Way globular clusters, and found the Milky Way had about one half of the mass previously supposed.

While at the Lick Observatory, Mayall collaborated on a 20-year project with astronomers at Mount Palomar and Mount Wilson on the Big Bang theory of the beginning of the Universe. Together with Milton L. Humason and Allan R. Sandage, he wrote a 1956 paper concluding that the age of the Universe was six billion years (three times the prior estimate, and about half the modern value), and its size three times larger than thought.

World War II
After the United States entered World War II, Mayall accepted a position at the MIT Radiation Laboratory in Cambridge, Massachusetts to work on radar development. He began his work early in 1942 in Cambridge, which was the only time during his adult life that he resided outside California or Arizona.  However, the climate of Massachusetts was unlike that of California, which he and his family were accustomed to, and in the middle of 1943 he arranged a transfer to the Pasadena Mt. Wilson Observatory offices. Many wartime Office of Scientific Research and Development (OSRD) projects related to optics, aerial gunnery, aerial photography, and bombing tactics were already in progress there.  Unhappy with the management of his project and feeling his talents were not being well used, he transferred again in February 1944 to Caltech to work on the development of large rockets.  There he became an expert on high-speed photography, which was used to analyze rocket trajectories.  In the spring of 1945, he was transferred to a secret atomic bomb project that also required high-speed photography.  He visited Los Alamos twice, including once around the time of the Trinity test.  By October 1, 1945, the war had ended and Mayall had returned to astronomical research at Lick.

120-inch (3.0 m) telescope

During World War II Mayall became an important influence on Lick Observatory's future.  Ever since 1931, when he had returned to Lick and Berkeley after serving two years as an assistant at Mount Wilson, he had felt strongly that Mount Hamilton required a larger telescope.  The astronomers at Lick were proud of their ability to achieve important results with Lick's small  Crossley reflector. Its diminutive size first became apparent in 1908, when Mount Wilson's  telescope saw first light. This was accentuated by the opening of the  Dominion Astrophysical Observatory in 1917, and Mount Wilson's even larger  Hooker telescope in 1919. Mayall was adept at working with the small Crossley, but understood that it could never really stand up to a competing telescope that collected nine times the amount of light. This was only going to get worse when the  Hale Telescope was completed at Palomar Observatory. Mayall and other young faculty at Lick thought that the older faculty such as Moore and Wright were too committed to the small telescopes and should have tried harder to obtain a larger reflector.

Unknown to Mayall, Lick observatory director William H. Wright and his predecessor, Robert G. Aitken, had both tried in secret to raise money for a larger reflector to replace the  Crossley Reflector. They tried both private sources as well as trying to get Robert Gordon Sproul, the University of California President, to provide for one in the budget.  Despite multiple attempts, they continued to fail, primarily due to the Great Depression.  However, in 1942, Sproul asked Paul W. Merrill from Mt. Wilson to succeed Wright, but was turned down.  Agitated by the refusal, Sproul changed his stance and told the regents that they had to find a way to raise money for a new telescope once the war ended.  At about this time, Sproul promised or secretly appointed C. Donald Shane as director of Lick, to take over when the war ended.

The plan for a large telescope was leaked around September 1944 in the form of the University's budget proposals. Mayall and Gerald E. Kron sent a letter to Sproul representing the younger Lick staff members, in which they requested a meeting to discuss the kind of telescope to be built. They met with Sproul in December 1944 in Sproul's Los Angeles office. Mayall spoke of the key need for a telescope exceeding . At the Caltech optical shop in Pasadena he had seen the nearly completed  Pyrex glass disc that was initially planned to be used as a flat in the auto-collimation test of the  Palomar mirror and urged Sproul to have the Lick telescope use a mirror of that size. Much to their surprise, Sproul agreed.

Shane was appointed chairman of a committee formed by Sproul in the beginning of 1945, to plan the new reflector.  Other committee members included Mayall, Moore, Walter S. Adams and Ira S. Bowen.  The committee functioned primarily through correspondence.  Mayall's first letter helped to convince Shane that  was feasible instead of just . Mayall helped to bridge the gap between the experienced team of telescope designers in Pasadena and Shane, who was more experienced as a university administrator and professor. Adams and the executive officer of the  project, John August Anderson, shared their experience, drawings and plans with the Lick design committee.  On March 6, 1945, with both Mayall and Shane present, the committee decided upon the basic parameters of what would become the  C. Donald Shane telescope.  On March 7, Mayall joined Shane, Wright and Moore (not present at the March 6 meeting), at Mt. Hamilton to choose the location upon which to build the reflector.

Postwar Lick research

During the long period of building the  telescope, Mayall continued to use Lick's  Crossley Reflector and focused his efforts on utilizing his slitless spectrograph, which was optimized for extended, low-surface-brightness clusters, galaxies, and nebulae. In 1946, he completed his pre-war effort to get integrated spectra of globular clusters and published the work. His paper was key in demonstrating that the system of Milky Way globular clusters shares only slightly the galactic rotation found in the flattened disc of interstellar matter and young stars in our galaxy. In 1948, Mayall serendipitously discovered a type II supernova while conducting other research.

Other research Mayall performed included the 20 year collaboration (formulated in 1935 by Hubble) with Milton Humason, to gather redshift values for all northern galaxies brighter than +13 visual magnitude.  Mayall handled the brighter galaxies on the Crossley, while Humason tackled the fainter ones using the Mount Wilson .  This work resulted in the 1956 paper he co-authored with Humason and Allan Sandage, on the rate of expansion of the Universe. The paper listed over 800 redshift values (300 determined by Mayall) for galaxies measured from 1935 to 1955 at Lick, Wilson and Palomar.

At Lick, he also studied galactic dynamics, such as the rotational motion of the Andromeda and Triangulum galaxies.  He presented this work at a symposium on the structure of the Milky Way on June 23, 1950, at the University of Michigan in Ann Arbor. This work demonstrated the inner solid-body rotation and the outer Keplerian motion. In 1953, together with O. J. Eggen, Mayall identified six likely globular clusters (including Mayall II) around the Andromeda Galaxy in a Palomar 48-inch schmidt plate exposed in 1948 that was provided to them by Hubble.

Gerry Kron marveled at the sensitivity of Mayall's eyes that could reach down to +17 visual magnitude using the  telescope.  Mayall's eyesight later deteriorated to the point that he could no longer read.

The new  telescope became operational at the beginning of 1960. Mayall immediately began using it, although he left Lick in September of that year.

Kitt Peak National Observatory

Mayall moved on from the University of California (after more than 25 years progressing from student to astronomer), to become the second director of Kitt Peak National Observatory (KPNO).  With financial support from the National Science Foundation, several universities had formed a consortium — the Association of Universities for Research in Astronomy (AURA). Its purpose was to create and run a research observatory for American astronomers. The first director was Aden B. Meinel, who chose the site near Tucson at the  Kitt Peak,  and oversaw the building of its first telescope, the  reflector which was completed in the spring of 1960.

However, the AURA board decided that Meinel was not well suited for the job and chose Mayall to replace him on October 1, 1960, even though he had no previous administrative experience. Mayall had previously been appointed (in 1958) as a consultant to AURA, due to his experience in planning the Lick  telescope. The board's president was Shane, who was representing the University of California, and he helped convince Mayall to accept the offer.

As director, Mayall oversaw the building of the  Kitt Peak reflector. It was still being built when he retired in 1971, and was completed in 1973, at which point it was named the Nicholas U. Mayall Telescope in his honor. Mayall was intimately involved in the expansion of the national observatory to the Southern Hemisphere in what eventually became the Cerro Tololo Interamerican Observatory (CTIO). The  Víctor M. Blanco Telescope at CTIO (identical to the Mayall Telescope at Kitt Peak) saw first light in 1974 and was completed in 1976.

Retirement
Mayall retired in 1971, at the age of 65, an event that was honored by a symposium held on his birthday, May 8.  During his retirement, he continued to play an active role in many organizations, including the overview committee for Fermilab.  He died on January 5, 1993, of complications caused by diabetes; his ashes were spread high on an empty ridge of Kitt Peak. Mayall was survived by his wife of 58 years, Kathleen Boxall, and their two children: Bruce Ian Mayall (1939) and Pamela Ann Mayall, their two grandchildren: Shane Nicholas Oakes (1977) and Bryce Oakes Mayall (1979).

Honors
Member of the United States National Academy of Sciences, elected in 1949
Member of the American Academy of Arts and Sciences from 1961
 Member of the American Philosophical Society from 1962

Honor societies

Sigma Xi
Phi Beta Kappa

Named after Mayall
Five globular clusters: Mayall II, Mayall III, Mayall IV, Mayall V, and Mayall VI
Mayall's Object, a pair of interacting galaxies
2131 Mayall, a minor planet
Nicholas U. Mayall Telescope at Kitt Peak National Observatory

Publications

See also

IC 10 – Mayall was first to suggest that it is extragalactic

References

Cited sources

External links
 Mayall and others inspecting the Mayall 4-meter primary blank
 Picture of Mayall next to the telescope named in his honor
 Mayall observing the sun with others in 1964
 Mayall on March 2, 1973 viewing through the telescope to be named in his honor

1906 births
1993 deaths
People from Moline, Illinois
20th-century American astronomers
American cosmologists
Deaths from diabetes
University of California, Berkeley alumni
People from Stockton, California
Lick Observatory
Members of the American Philosophical Society